Volsky (masculine), Volskaya (feminine), or Volskoye (neuter) may refer to:

People
Arkady Volsky (1932–2006), Russian politician
Lavon Volski (b. 1965), Belarusian musician and poet
Paula Volsky, American fantasy writer
Tamara Volskaya, Russian musician
Vasily Volsky (1897–1946), Soviet general

Places
Volsky District, a district of Saratov Oblast, Russia
Volskaya (rural locality), a rural locality (a village) in Arkhangelsk Oblast, Russia
Volskoye, a rural locality (a village) in Tver Oblast, Russia

See also
 
Volsk, a town in Saratov Oblast, Russia
Volesky, a surname
Wolski, Polish last name

Russian-language surnames

ru:Вольский